Kilby Hotel is a historic hotel building located at High Point, Guilford County, North Carolina. It was built in 1910, and is a three-story, brick building with shops on its first story. It has a shallow bracketed canopy, fine brickwork, and arched windows.  The hotel was one of High Point's most important black owned businesses and served predominantly African-American patrons.

It was listed on the National Register of Historic Places in 1982. In 2012, the structure was deemed unsafe, and it was demolished in 2014 after two of its walls collapsed in a storm.

References

African-American history of North Carolina
Buildings and structures in High Point, North Carolina
Hotel buildings on the National Register of Historic Places in North Carolina
Hotel buildings completed in 1910
National Register of Historic Places in Guilford County, North Carolina
Demolished buildings and structures in North Carolina
Buildings and structures demolished in 2014